The Fuzhou Ring Expressway, designated as G1505 and also referred to as the Fuzhou Fourth Ring Road, is ring expressway in Fuzhou, Fujian, China.

History
The first section of the Fuzhou Ring Expressway was opened to traffic on 28 December 2004. The northwest section was opened in several phases from 1 October 2010 to 5 March 2012. The southeast section was opened to traffic on 29 September 2019 thus completing the Fuzhou Ring Expressway.

References

Chinese national-level expressways
Expressways in Fujian
Transport in Fuzhou